Liolaemus petrophilus is a species of lizard in the family Iguanidae.  It is endemic to Argentina.

References

petrophilus
Lizards of South America
Reptiles of Argentina
Endemic fauna of Argentina
Reptiles described in 1971
Taxa named by Roberto Donoso-Barros
Taxa named by José Miguel Alfredo María Cei